Matheus Facho Inocêncio (first name also written Mateus; born 17 May 1981 in Patrocínio Paulista) is a Brazilian athlete who specializes in the 110 metres hurdles.

His personal best time is 13.33 seconds, achieved during the Olympic Games in Athens.

He also participated in the bobsleigh competition at the 2002 Winter Olympics, where he was part of the Brazilian bobsleigh 4-crew that ranked 27th out of 29 finishing and 33 competing teams.

Competition record

External links

 Matheus Inocêncio at Sports-Reference.com

1981 births
Living people
Sportspeople from São Paulo (state)
Brazilian male hurdlers
Athletes (track and field) at the 2004 Summer Olympics
Athletes (track and field) at the 2011 Pan American Games
Bobsledders at the 2002 Winter Olympics
Olympic athletes of Brazil
Olympic bobsledders of Brazil
Brazilian male bobsledders
Universiade medalists in athletics (track and field)
Universiade gold medalists for Brazil
Pan American Games athletes for Brazil
21st-century Brazilian people